Strikeforce was an American mixed martial arts organization. It crowned male champions in the lightweight, welterweight, middleweight, light heavyweight and heavyweight divisions, and female champions in featherweight and bantamweight.

World champions

Men's championships

Heavyweight Championship
 to

Light Heavyweight Championship
 to

Middleweight Championship
 to

Welterweight Championship
 to

Lightweight Championship
 to

Women's championships

Women's Featherweight Championship
 to 
Formerly known as the Women's Lightweight Championship and the Women's Middleweight Championship

Women's Bantamweight Championship
 to 
Formerly known as the Women's Welterweight Championship

U.S. champions

Middleweight U.S. Championship
 to

Lightweight U.S. Championship
 to

Tournament winners

Records

Most wins in title bouts

Most consecutive title defenses

Champions by nationality
The division champions include only linear and true champions. Interim champions who have never become linear champions will be listed as interim champions. Fighters with multiple title reigns in a specific division will also be counted once. Runners-up are not included in tournaments champions.

See also
 List of Strikeforce alumni
 List of Strikeforce events
 List of current mixed martial arts champions
 List of Bellator MMA champions
 List of Dream champions
 List of EliteXC champions
 List of Invicta FC champions
 List of ONE Championship champions
 List of Pancrase champions
 List of Pride champions
 List of PFL champions
 List of Shooto champions
 List of UFC champions
 List of WEC champions
 Mixed martial arts weight classes

References

Strikeforce Champions, List Of